The 1982–83 Robert Morris Colonials men's basketball team represented Robert Morris University in the 1982–83 NCAA Division I basketball season. Robert Morris was coached by Matthew Furjanic Jr. and played their home games at the John Jay Center in Moon Township, PA. The Colonials were members of the ECAC Metro Conference. They finished the season 23–8, 12–2 in conference play. They won the ECAC Metro tournament to earn the conference's automatic bid to the 1983 NCAA Division I men's basketball tournament. They earned one of two 12 seeds in the Mideast Region and defeated Georgia Southern in the play-in game, avenging an early season loss to the Eagles. The Colonials were then beaten 55–53 by Purdue in the first round.

Roster

Schedule and results

|-
!colspan=9 style=| Regular season

|-
!colspan=9 style=| ECAC Metro tournament

|-
!colspan=10 style=| NCAA tournament

References

Robert Morris Colonials
Robert Morris
Robert Morris Colonials men's basketball seasons
Robert
Robert